This is a list of Malaysian football transfers for the 2010 transfer window. Moves featuring Malaysia Super League, Malaysia Premier League and Malaysia FAM Cup club are listed.

The first transfer window began once clubs had concluded their final domestic fixture of the 2009 season.

2010 Transfers 
All clubs without a flag are Malaysian. Otherwise it will be stated.

Transfers

Loans 
Players were loaned for Malaysia Cup matches only.

Unattached Players

Notes

References

2010
Tranfers
Malaysia